Masjid Al Mu'mineen (Arabic: المَسْجِد المُؤمنِين, lit. The Mosque of the Believers) is a Sunni orthodox mosque located on the near east side of Indianapolis, Indiana. Established in 2001, it is the third Islamic place of worship founded in the city of Indianapolis and serves a weekly prayer congregation of 150-250 men, women, and children. Masjid Al Mu'mineen houses the SHARE (Services for Human Advancement and Resource Enhancement) Center Inc., which is a 501(c)3 nonprofit organization that acts as the mosque's community service arm. SHARE Center initiatives include an offender re-entry program called Siratal Mustaqeem (the Straight Path), a summer feeding program sponsored by the U.S. Department of Agriculture & Indiana Department of Education, and a food pantry that serves approximately 100 households per month.

In 2015, the Shura Council voted unanimously to support the "ISNA Statement on Inclusion of Women in Masjids" created by the Islamic Society of North America (ISNA).

In 2018, a portion of CNN's This is Life documentary series by Lisa Ling was filmed at Masjid Al Mu'mineen in addition to a brief interview with the mosque's board chairman Imam Ismail Abdul-Aleem.

History 
Islamic institutions were established in Indianapolis, Indiana roughly between the 1940s and the 1980s, with African-American Muslim Institutions being established between the 1940s - 1950s and the immigrant Muslim institutions being established between the 1960s - 1980s. Further, by 1990 there were an estimated 2,000 Muslims living in the city of Indianapolis.

By 2000, the Indianapolis Muslim population had increased and started to outgrow the city's primary orthodox place of worship Masjid Al Fajr (Indianapolis Muslim Community Association). Later that year, a group led by Amin Alghani sought a new location in the city to establish another Islamic place of worship. After establishing ad hoc worship spaces in different locations, the group finally established Masjid Al Mu'muneen at its current location on the near east side of Indianapolis, Indiana.

Leadership and organization 
The physical, data, and intellectual properties of Masjid Al Mu'mineen are owned by its board of trustees. Day-to-day operations are managed by the Shura Council, which is a 9-member Board of Directors that meets monthly.

Religious services 
Masjid Al Mu'mineen offers several religious services to the Indianapolis Muslim community:

 Salatul Jumu'ah (Friday Prayer): The Friday prayer services are held weekly. Khatibs are selected from the pool of knowledgeable men in the Indianapolis Muslim community.
 Marriage & Wedding Ceremonies: Nikah contract services offered to the Indianapolis Muslim Community. All Imams and Assistant Imans have authority to perform marriage within the State of Indiana and sign marriage licenses that are issued by the city. Marriages are performed according to Islamic legal customs. 
 Talaq/Khula (Divorce): Islamic divorce and mediation. Divorce agreements under Islamic legal customs does not mean couples are legally divorced in the State of Indiana. Final divorce proceedings should be done at Marion County City-County Building.
 Janazah(Funeral): Preparation and prayer services.

SHARE Center and outreach 
The Mosque has a 501(c)3 non-profit component in the SHARE Center of Indianapolis. This was formed to help the Mosque better implement its work within both their religious community and the greater community at large by providing. referral services for job training, employment, housing, mental health programs, and counseling as well as several community service programs, including:

Community service programs 

Siratal Mustaqeem (The Straight Path) Support Group: This is an initiate established in the early 2000s which focuses on helping both Muslim and non-Muslim community members that have past battles with substance abuse, and other similar issues, to come together for sharing coping strategies, to feel more empowered and for a sense of community.
Lut's Food Pantry: In collaboration with the Gleaners Food Bank of Indiana,  Al Huda Foundation, and other local supporters, Lut's Food Pantry is open two weekend per months and serves approximately 100 families. The food pantry is managed by the Women's Committee and draws monthly Muslim and non-Muslim volunteers of 10-15 people from central Indianapolis area.
Summer Feeding Program: The Summer Feeding Program is an affiliate and program site for Indianapolis' Summer Servings Program. It is also affiliated with the USDA Summer Food Service Program (SFSP). This program helps us serve all children under the age of 18 in Marion County. During the summer months, this program serves as a substitute for the meals (breakfast and lunch) that children would usually receive during the school year.

Beliefs 
Masjid Al Mumineen adheres to the fundamental beliefs which are:

Articles of Faith (Aqeedah)

 Belief in God Almighty (Allah); that he is the Creator, Sustainer, and the only one that controls and holds dominion over all of creation. Belief in Allah requires recognizing that He is the only one worthy of our devotion, supplications, and worship.
 Belief in all the Prophets of God; Adam, Noah (Nuh), Abraham (Ibrahim), Isaac (Ishaq), Jacob (Yaqub), Josep (Yusuf), Moses (Musa), Aaron (Harun), John the Baptist (Yahya), Jesus (Isa), and Muhammad (Peace and Blessing Upon Them All), as well as those not mentioned. We believe in all of them, recognize their mission, and follow them in their message of worshipping One God.
 Belief in the original scriptures revealed by God Almighty to his Prophets; the Torah having been given to Moses, the Psalms to David, the Gospel to Jesus, and the Quran given to Muhammad (Peace and Blessing Upon Them All). All of these scriptures are recognized by Muslims as revelation. The Qur'an, God's Almighty's final revelation is a culmination of message of the previous scriptures; it is a standard by which we live by containing eternal guidance for the salvation of Mankind.
 Belief in the angels; that they are the unseen servants of God Almighty's, implementing his will and watching over mankind.
 Belief in the Day of Judgment and the Hereafter; that all of mankind will be called to account for their deeds, and be righteously judged accordingly on the last day.
 Belief in Divine design and decree; that God Almighty's has knowledge of all things, has written all things, and all things he has willed must come to pass.

Pillars of Islam (Acts of Worship) 

 Shahada: Testifying that God Almighty is one, without spouse, son, or partner and that Muhammad (Peace and Blessing Be Upon Him) is the last Prophet & Messenger of God Almighty. This testimony pronounced to become a Muslim, and is repeated several times a day in prayers and devotions as an affirmation of God's oneness and a confirmation of faith.
 Salah: Formal prayer five times a day. By praying five times a day, one actively submits his will to God Almighty and devotes his mind, body, and soul to his worship. Formal prayer is both preventative and prescriptive; it serves as a reminder to avoid evil deeds and helps to expiate the effects of any sin committed throughout the day.
 Siyam: Fasting during the month of Ramadan. During Ramadan, Muslims fast each day from dawn to dusk by refraining from food, drinks and sensual pleasures. These outward actions have an effect on the inward, reminding believers that instead of being dependent on corporeal stimuli, they must rely on God Almighty alone. Abstaining from food & drink serves another purpose, that is to remind the believer of his duty to those less fortunate amongst fellow man, and that with God's bounties comes responsibility to our brothers and sisters in humanity.
 Zakat: Alms to the Poor. With the blessing of wealth comes responsibility to give back to those less fortunate. Zakat, the Arabic word for obligatory alms, is a purification of wealth and a method of redistributing wealth to those in need.
 Hajj: Pilgrimage to Mecca at least once, if physically and financially able. Pilgrimage to Makkah commemorates the rites of Abraham in devoting his life to God Almighty. It is the culmination of the previous four pillars of Islam, consisting of prayers, devotions, charity & sacrifice.

References

External links 
 Official website

Sunni mosques in the United States
Religious buildings and structures in Indiana
Buildings and structures completed in 2001
2001 establishments in Indiana
Religion in Indianapolis